This was the first edition of the tournament.

Chen Ti and Peng Hsien-yin won the title, defeating Jordan Kerr and Fabrice Martin in the final, 6–2, 3–6, [12–10].

Seeds

Draw

Draw

References
 Main Draw

ATP Challenger China International - Nanchang - Doubles
2014 Doubles